An airport with a mandatory frequency (MF), mandatory traffic advisory frequency (MTAF) or air/ground radio (A/G) is an airport which does not have a control tower but still requires arriving and departing aircraft to communicate with other aircraft or a radio operator on a published frequency.

Mandatory frequency airports are rare in the United States, one example being Ketchikan International Airport, but they are common in other countries such as Canada, Australia, the United Kingdom and Norway; often, an MF or MTAF airport is one with scheduled passenger service but insufficient traffic to support a control tower. If there is a flight service specialist monitoring the frequency, the specialist will give pilots advisories about traffic, weather, and surface conditions, and may relay IFR clearances from en route controllers, but cannot give clearances themselves.

In the United Kingdom, this type of airport is said to have an Air/Ground Radio service, using the callsign suffix "Radio".  This is provided at airports that have a moderate level of VFR-only GA traffic.

Some examples of MF airports in Canada include Kingston/Norman Rogers Airport and Kuujjuaq Airport.

Air traffic control
Airbands